The Florin was the currency of the British colonies and protectorates of East Africa between 1920 and 1921. It was divided into 100 cents. It replaced the East African rupee at par, and was replaced in turn by the East African shilling at a rate of 2 shillings = 1 florin. The florin was equivalent to 2 shillings sterling.

Coins

Because of its short period in existence, few of the coins minted were actually issued and are consequently scarce today. Coins were minted in denominations of 1, 5, 10, 25 and 50 cents and 1 florin but, according to the "Standard Catalog of World Coins" (C. L. Krause & C. Mishler, Krause Publications), the 50 cents coins were not released for circulation and only 30% of the 1, 5 and 10 cent coins produced were issued for circulation.

Banknotes

The East African Currency Board issued notes in denominations of 1, 5, 10, 20, 50, 100 and 500 florins, with the notes valued at 10 florins and above also carrying the denomination in pounds (1, 2, 5, 10 and 50).

References

Global Financial Data currency histories table
Tables of modern monetary history: Kenya
Tables of modern monetary history: Tanzania
Tables of modern monetary history: Uganda

Currencies of Africa
Currencies of the British Empire
Currencies of Kenya
Currencies of Tanzania
Currencies of Uganda
Modern obsolete currencies
East Africa
1920 establishments in the British Empire
1921 disestablishments in the British Empire
1920s economic history
Economic history of Uganda